Betrayal from the East is a 1945 American spy drama film starring Lee Tracy and Nancy Kelly. The film was directed by William A. Berke and based on the book Betrayal from the East: The Inside Story of Japanese Spies in America by Alan Hynd. The supporting cast features Richard Loo, Regis Toomey, Philip Ahn, Victor Sen Yung, Jason Robards Sr. and Drew Pearson.

Plot
An American is recruited by a Japanese spy ring operating in the United States, prior to the country's entry into World War II.

Cast
Lee Tracy as Eddie Carter
Nancy Kelly as Peggy Harrison
Richard Loo as Lieutenant Commander Toshio Miyazaki, alias Tani
Regis Toomey as Agent Posing as "Sergeant Jimmy Scott"
Abner Biberman as Yamato
Philip Ahn	as Kato
Addison Richards as Captain Bates, G-2
Bruce Edwards as Purdy, G-2 Agent
Hugh Ho Chang as Mr. Araki (billed as Hugh Hoo)
Victor Sen Yung as Omaya (billed as Sen Young)
Roland Varno as Kurt Guenther
Louis Jean Heydt as Jack Marsden
Jason Robards Sr.	as Charlie Hildebrand (billed as Jason Robards)
Drew Pearson as himself

See also 
Across the Pacific, a similar 1942 film starring Humphrey Bogart

External links 
 
 

1945 films
1945 drama films
1940s American films
1940s English-language films
1940s spy drama films
American black-and-white films
American spy drama films
Films based on non-fiction books
Films directed by William A. Berke
Films scored by Roy Webb
Films with screenplays by Aubrey Wisberg
Pacific War films
RKO Pictures films
World War II films made in wartime